{{Infobox language
| name = Judeo-Malayalam
| nativename = യെഹൂദ്യമലയാളം (yehūdyamalayāḷaṃ)מלאיאלאם יהודית (malayalam yəhûḏîṯ)
| pronunciation = 
| states = Kerala, Israel
| ethnicity = Cochin Jews
| speakers = a few dozen
| date = 2009
| ref = 
| familycolor = Dravidian
| fam2 = Southern Dravidian
| fam3 = Tamil–Kannada
| fam4 = Tamil–Kodagu
| fam5 = Tamil–Malayalam
| fam6 = Malayalamoid
| fam7 = Malayalam
| script = Malayalam alphabetHebrew alphabet
| isoexception = dialect
| glotto = jewi1241
| glottoname = Jewish Malayalam
| notice = Indic
| map = Judeo-Malayalam map.svg
| mapcaption = Judeo-Malayalam speaking communities in Kerala (largely historical) and Israel (current)
}}

Judeo-Malayalam is the traditional language of the Cochin Jews (also called Malabar Jews), from Kerala, in southern India, spoken today by a few dozens of people in Israel and by probably fewer than 25 in India.

Judeo-Malayalam is the only known Dravidian Jewish language. (There is another Dravidian language spoken regularly by a Jewish community Telugu, spoken by the small, and only very newly observant Jewish community of east-central Andhra Pradesh but because of the long period in which the people were not practicing Judaism, they did not develop any distinctly identifiable Judeo-Telugu language or the dialect. See main article:  Telugu Jews.)

Since it does not differ substantially in grammar or syntax from other colloquial Malayalam dialects, it is not considered by many linguists to be a language in its own right, but a dialect, or simply a language variation. Judeo-Malayalam shares with other Jewish languages like Ladino, Judeo-Arabic and Yiddish, common traits and features. For example, verbatim translations from Hebrew to Malayalam, archaic features of Old Malayalam, Hebrew components agglutinated to Dravidian verb and noun formations and special idiomatic usages based on its Hebrew loanwords. Due to the lack of long-term scholarship on this language variation, there is no separate designation for the language (if it can be so considered), for it to have its own language code (see also SIL and ISO 639).

Unlike many Jewish languages, Judeo-Malayalam is not written using the Hebrew alphabet. It does, however, like most Jewish languages, contain many Hebrew loanwords, which are regularly transliterated, as much as possible, using the Malayalam script. Like many other Jewish languages, Judeo-Malayalam also contains a number of lexical, phonological and syntactic archaisms, in this case, from the days before Malayalam became fully distinguished from Tamil.

In spite of claims by some Paradesi Jews that their ancestors' Ladino influenced the development of Judeo-Malayalam, so far no such influence, not even on the superficial lexical level, is found. There is, however, affiliation with Mappila Malayalam, especially of North Malabar, in words such as khabar or khabura (grave), and formations such as mayyattŭ āyi (മയ്യത്ത് ആയി) used by Muslims and śālōṃ āyi (ശാലോം ആയി) used by Jews for died (മരിച്ചു പോയി, mariccu pōyi in standard Malayalam). As with the parent language, Judeo-Malayalam also contains loanwords from Sanskrit and Pali as a result of the long-term affiliation of Malayalam, like all the other Dravidian languages, with Pali and Sanskrit through sacred and secular Buddhist and Hindu texts.

Because the vast majority of scholarship regarding the Cochin Jews has concentrated on the ethnographic accounts in English provided by Paradesi Jews (sometimes also called White Jews), who immigrated to Kerala from Europe in the sixteenth century and later, the study of the status and role of Judeo-Malayalam has suffered neglect. Since their emigration to Israel, Cochin Jewish immigrants have participated in documenting and studying the last speakers of Judeo-Malayalam, mostly in Israel. In 2009, a documentation project was launched under the auspices of the Ben-Zvi Institute in Jerusalem. Digital copies can be obtained for any scholar who wishes to study Judeo-Malayalam.

Thapan Dubayehudi has spoken Judeo-Malayalam on a Wikitongues' preservation project video in an effort to preserve the language on their official YouTube channel.

See also
 Suriyani Malayalam
 Arabi Malayalam

References

"Judeo-Malayalam page", Jewish Language Research
"Malayalam" page, Ethnologue
Hebrew (omniglot.com)
"Jews of India", The South Asian''

External links
 An old manuscript of Jewish Women's Malayalam Song Notebook
 Judeo-Malayalam recorded from Wikitongues

Cochin Jews
Dravidian languages
Jewish languages
Jews and Judaism in India
Malayalam dialects
Languages of Kerala
Judaism in Kerala
Endangered languages of India